Hitty, Her First Hundred Years is a children's novel written by Rachel Field and published in 1929. It won the Newbery Medal for excellence in American children's literature in 1930. The book is told from the point of view of an inanimate doll named Hitty (short for Mehitabel), who was constructed in the 1820s and has since traveled around the world, through many different owners.

In 1999, Susan Jeffers and Rosemary Wells updated, simplified, and rewrote Hitty's story, adding an episode about Hitty's experiences in the American Civil War.

Plot summary
The narrative unfolds through the eyes of a tiny wooden doll named Mehitabel (Hittie), who was carved early in the nineteenth century from the magical wood of the Mountain Ash tree by a peddler for a little girl, Phoebe Preble, who lives on Great Cranberry Island in Maine, during a winter when her father was away at sea. As the doll narrates her beginning:

The book details Hitty's adventures as she becomes separated from Phoebe and travels from owner to owner over the course of a century. She ends up living in locations as far-flung as Boston, New Orleans, India, and the South Pacific. At various times, she is lost at sea, hidden in a horsehair sofa, abandoned in a hayloft, part of a snake-charmer's act, and picked up by the famous writer Charles Dickens, before arriving at her new owner's summer home in Maine, which turns out to be the original Preble residence where she first lived.  From there she is purchased at auction for a New York antique shop, where she sits among larger and grander dolls of porcelain and wax, and writes her memoirs.

The story was inspired by a doll purchased by Field.  The doll currently resides at the Stockbridge Library Association in Stockbridge, Massachusetts.

Adaptations 
In 1999, children's book author Rosemary Wells and illustrator Susan Jeffers adapted Field's novel to an illustrated storybook titled Rachel Field's Hitty: Her First Hundred Years. In a review of the text, children's literature scholar Cathryn M. Mercier notes that the adaptation removes some of the more archaic and problematic language found in Field's novel, but that Hitty loses some of her distinct characterization.

Further reading
Smart, Wini and Bruce Komusin. Hitty Preble of the Cranberry Isles, Maine. Publication of the Great Cranberry Island Historical Society, 2004.

References

1929 American novels
1999 American novels
1929 children's books
American children's novels
Children's historical novels
Macmillan Publishers books
Newbery Medal–winning works
Novels set in Boston
Novels set in India
Novels set in Maine
Novels set in New Orleans
Novels set in New York City
Novels set in Philadelphia
Novels set in the 19th century
Novels set in the 20th century
Sentient toys in fiction
Stockbridge, Massachusetts